Andriy Fomin (born 14 November 1977) is a Ukrainian speed skater. He competed in three events at the 2002 Winter Olympics.

References

External links
 

1977 births
Living people
Ukrainian male speed skaters
Olympic speed skaters of Ukraine
Speed skaters at the 2002 Winter Olympics
Sportspeople from Sumy